Malleidae, or hammer oysters, is a family of saltwater clams. They are related to the pearl oysters, in the order Pteriida and the superfamily Pterioidea.

The shells of most of these animals are T-shaped, with the hinge along the top of the T, and with the byssus emerging from the hinge. An oblique ligament holds the hinge. The shell is partially nacreous. There is a single, large adductor muscle. The exhalant current exits at the hinge.

Most hammer oysters live in tropical, coralline areas.

Genera
 Malleus Lamarck, 1799
 Neoaviculovulsa Okutani & Kusakari, 1987
 Vulsella

The following genera have been brought into synonymy.
 Brevimalleus McLean, 1947 accepted as Malleus Lamarck, 1799
 Fundella Gregorio, 1884 accepted as Malleus Lamarck, 1799
 Himantopoda Schumacher, 1817 accepted as Malleus Lamarck, 1799
 Malleolus Rafinesque, 1815 accepted as Malleus Lamarck, 1799
 Malvufundus de Gregorio, 1885 accepted as Malleus Lamarck, 1799
 Parimalleus Iredale, 1931 accepted as Malleus Lamarck, 1799
 Tudes Oken, 1815 accepted as Malleus Lamarck, 1799

References

External links
 POPPE images of various Malleidae species

 
Bivalve families